Tabersonine is a terpene indole alkaloid found in the medicinal plant Catharanthus roseus and also in the genus Voacanga (both taxa belonging to the alkaloid-rich family Apocynaceae).  Tabersonine is hydroxylated at the 16 position by the enzyme tabersonine 16-hydroxylase (T16H) to form 16-hydroxytabersonine.  The enzyme leading to its formation is currently unknown.  Tabersonine is the first intermediate leading to the formation of vindoline one of the two precursors required for vinblastine biosynthesis.

See also 
Conopharyngine
Tabernanthine
Vinblastine

References

Indole alkaloids